The 2020 ICC Women's T20 World Cup was the seventh ICC Women's T20 World Cup tournament. It was held in Australia between 21 February and 8 March 2020. The final took place at the Melbourne Cricket Ground on International Women's Day. Hosts Australia won the tournament, beating India by 85 runs, to win their fifth title.

It was a standalone tournament, the men's tournament was initially held eight months ahead of the schedule, but would be postponed to 2021 due to the COVID-19 pandemic. Australia were the defending champions, and lost their opening match of the tournament against India. For the first time at the Women's T20 World Cup, the International Cricket Council (ICC) announced the use of technology to monitor front-foot no-balls for all matches during the tournament. The third umpire assisted the umpire at the bowler's end in calling the front-foot no-balls, communicating this to the on-field umpires.

India were the first team to qualify for the semi-finals, after recording three wins from their first three matches. India won their final group game, against Sri Lanka, and finished top of Group A. South Africa were the second team to qualify for the semi-finals, after they also won their first three group games. England were the third team to advance to the semi-finals, after beating the West Indies in their final group game. In the final match of Group A, hosts Australia beat New Zealand by four runs to take the fourth and final spot in the semi-finals. The final match in Group B, between South Africa and the West Indies, was abandoned due to rain, meaning South Africa finished top of the group. Therefore, England were drawn against India in the first semi-final, and Australia faced South Africa in the second semi-final.

The first semi-final was abandoned with no play due to rain, meaning India advanced to the final, after finishing top of Group A. It was the first time that India had progressed to the final of the Women's T20 World Cup. In the second semi-final, hosts Australia beat South Africa by five runs in a rain-affected match.

Teams and qualification
The tournament featured 10 teams. The eight top-ranked teams based on finishing positions from the 2018 ICC Women's World Twenty20 qualified automatically. The remaining two qualification spots were determined through the 2019 ICC Women's World Twenty20 Qualifier, with Bangladesh and Thailand progressing. It was the first time that Thailand had qualified for a Women's T20 World Cup tournament. Following the conclusion of the qualification tournament, Bangladesh were placed in Group A and Thailand were placed in Group B.

Squads

Each team selected a squad of 15 players before the tournament, and were also able to replace any injured players.

Venues
In January 2018, the ICC announced that six venues in four cities would host matches. The semi-finals were hosted at the Sydney Cricket Ground, with the final being played at the Melbourne Cricket Ground.

Match officials
On 12 February 2020, the ICC appointed the officials for the tournament. Along with the twelve umpires, Steve Bernard, Chris Broad and G. S. Lakshmi were also named as the match referees.

 Lauren Agenbag
 Gregory Brathwaite
 Chris Brown
 Kim Cotton
 Shaun George
 Nitin Menon

 Claire Polosak
 Ahsan Raza
 Sue Redfern
 Langton Rusere
 Alex Wharf
 Jacqueline Williams

Group stage
The ICC released the fixture details on 29 January 2019 in Sydney.

Group A

Group B

Knockout stage

Semi-finals

Final

Statistics

Australia's Beth Mooney was the leading run-scorer in the tournament, with 259 runs. Her teammate, Megan Schutt, was the leading wicket-taker, finishing with thirteen dismissals.

Team of the tournament 
On 9 March 2020, ICC announced its team of the tournament picked by a selection panel featuring Ian Bishop, Anjum Chopra, Lisa Sthalekar, Raf Nicholson and Holly Colvin.

  Alyssa Healy (wk)
  Beth Mooney
  Nat Sciver
  Heather Knight
  Meg Lanning (c)
  Laura Wolvaardt
  Jess Jonassen
  Sophie Ecclestone
  Anya Shrubsole
  Megan Schutt
  Poonam Yadav
  Shafali Verma (12th woman)

Marketing
UNICEF Australia, the United Nations Children's Fund was chosen as the official charity partner for the tournament. Proceeds were raised throughout the competition to support UNICEF Australia's Sports for Development program to empower girls and boys in Sri Lanka.

Tickets for the event went on sale on 21 February 2019. All matches, including the final, had ticket prices for adults starting from $20. The ICC stated that more than half of all tickets available for sale for the tournament were priced at $20, with child tickets priced at $5. Star Sports were awarded the global broadcast rights for the tournament.

References

Notes

Further reading

External links
 Series home at ESPN Cricinfo

 
T20 World Cup
T20 World Cup
International women's cricket competitions in Australia
Women's T20 World Cup
Women's T20 World Cup
Women's T20 World Cup